Nicola Jackson (born 19 February 1984) is a British former competitive swimmer who won two world championships in relay events.

Swimming career
In 1999, Jackson won a silver medal at the World Short Course Championships in the 4×200-metre freestyle relay. The next year, at the 2000 FINA World Swimming Championships (25 m), she won a bronze medal in the 50-metre butterfly, and a gold medal as part of Great Britain's world-record-breaking 4×200-metre freestyle relay team. Jackson swam in the 2000 Summer Olympics in Sydney, as a member of Great Britain's 4×200-metre freestyle relay team, which finished in sixth place. In 2001, she won her only international medal in a long course championship, in the 4×200-metre freestyle relay at the 2001 World Aquatics Championships.

At the ASA National British Championships she won the 50 metres butterfly title in 1999.

Jackson studied at Durham University (Collingwood College). She is the sister of British swimmer Joanne Jackson.

See also
 World record progression 4 × 200 metres freestyle relay

References

1984 births
British female swimmers
Swimmers at the 2000 Summer Olympics
Olympic swimmers of Great Britain
Living people
British female freestyle swimmers
World Aquatics Championships medalists in swimming
Place of birth missing (living people)
Medalists at the FINA World Swimming Championships (25 m)
Alumni of Collingwood College, Durham
21st-century British women